Motala Municipality (Motala kommun) is a municipality in Östergötland County in southeast Sweden. Its seat is located in the city of Motala.

In 1971 Motala Municipality was formed by the amalgamation of the City of Motala with some of the adjacent rural municipalities. Three years later more entities were added, among them the former City of Vadstena. In 1980 a new Vadstena Municipality was split off.

Geographically, Motala is situated where Lake Vättern drains into the river system of Motala ström, which was of central importance to the massive industrialization of Sweden in the 19th century.

Sights and museums
Charlottenborg Castle
Godegård manorhouse with the Swedish Porcelain Museum
Göta Canal with locks
Medevi 17th century spa, the oldest in Sweden
Motala Church
Motala Motor Museum
The Museum of Motala Industrial History
Nubbekullen, birthplace of artist August Malmström
The Swedish Broadcasting Museum with the twin radio towers
Ulvåsa, manorhouse and medieval ruins of St Bridget's home
Varamon beach
Västra Stenby Church and rune stone
Övralid, manorhouse and home of author Verner von Heidenstam

Localities
Figures as of 2000, from Statistics Sweden.

Motala 30,136 (seat)
Borensberg 2,667
Tjällmo 562
Fornåsa 446
Nykyrka 434
Fågelsta 334
Österstad 329
Klockrike 275
Godegård 200

The population decreased by approximately 2% in most of the localities between the earlier census 1995 and the one in 2000.

Industry
The largest employer is the municipality itself, employing circa 3,400 people. The next is the county council with 1,775.

Of the private employers, Electrolux and Dometic have a total of 1,400; Autoliv 425; Hycop 325; Saab-Bofors Dynamics circa 300; And Motala Verkstad some 180. 
(source )

International relations

Twin towns — sister cities
Motala is twinned with:
 Daugavpils, Latvia
 Hyvinkää, Finland

References

External links

Motala Municipality - Official site
 Article Motala From Nordisk familjebok, 1913

 
Municipalities of Östergötland County